The Kinnesswood Formation is a geological formation in the Central Lowlands of Scotland. The lithology largely consists of sandstone with interbeds of limestone and siltstone

References

Geology of Scotland
Stratigraphy of the United Kingdom